The Wild Wind 20, also called the Gale Force 20 and Rinker 20, is an American trailerable sailboat that was designed as a cruiser and first built in 1982.

Production
The design was built by Gale Force Yachts in Syracuse, Indiana, United States, starting in 1982, but it is now out of production. Gale Force was the short-lived sailboat division of powerboat builder Rinkerbuilt Co., now called Rinker Boats and owned by Highwater Marine, LLC, which is a wholly-owned subsidiary of Polaris Industries Inc.

Design
The Wild Wind 20 is a recreational keelboat, built predominantly of fiberglass, with wood trim. It has a fractional  rig, a raked stem, a reverse transom, a transom-hung rudder controlled by a tiller and a fixed stub keel with a lifting keel. It displaces  and carries  of ballast.

The boat is normally fitted with a small  outboard motor for docking and maneuvering.

The design has sleeping accommodation for four people, with a double "V"-berth in the bow cabin and two straight settee berths in the main cabin.

Operational history
In a 2010 review Steve Henkel wrote, "best features: Offhand, we are hard pressed to find anything salutary worth mentioning. Worst features: The hull seems to be particularly ungainly, though in fairness, we haven't seen this boat in real life, only on paper. The layout is apparently a series of cushions laid end to end, and very little else—not our idea of a clever arrangement. The rudder appears to be a draftsman’s mistake, or a computer-graphics glitch: way too narrow, way too shallow to maintain full steering control in heavy wind and sea (or even in light wind and sea). In all, it isn't hard to see why Rinker decided against continuing production."

See also
List of sailing boat types

References

Keelboats
1980s sailboat type designs
Sailing yachts
Trailer sailers
Sailboat types built by Gale Force Yachts